Casper Stornes (born 6 February 1997) is a Norwegian triathlete competing in the ITU World Triathlon Series, ITU Triathlon World Cup, Super League Triathlon series and Ironman 70.3 distances.

He scored his first victory at ITU WTS Bermuda, taking the win ahead of his compatriots Kristian Blummenfelt and Gustav Iden. In doing so the three team-mates and training partners achieved the first ever 1-2-3 for a nation's athletes within the ITU WTS.

2020 season 

Due to the events of the COVID-19 outbreak the 2020 ITU World Triathlon Series was put on hold with no races being contested at the time of writing (1 July).

2019 season 

Stornes achieved a third place (bronze medal) finish at the 70.3 Ironman Middle East Championships for the second year running. This year he was beaten by Dane Daniel Bakkegard in silver, and his compatriot Kristian Blummenfelt in gold who went on to set a new Ironman 70.3 world record.

Stornes finished the 2019 season in 32nd place in the ITU WTS standings.

2018 season 

Stornes achieved a third place (bronze medal) finish at the 70.3 Ironman Middle East Championships, with his compatriots Gustav Iden and Kristian Blummenfelt finishing ahead of him in silver and gold respectively.

Stornes finished the 2018 season in 16th place in the ITU WTS standings.

2017 season 

Stornes finished the 2017 season in 87th place in the ITU WTS standings.

2016 season

2015 season

References

External links
 
 
 
 

1997 births
Living people
Norwegian male triathletes
Norwegian male long-distance runners
Olympic triathletes of Norway
Triathletes at the 2020 Summer Olympics